The 2004 New York City Marathon was the 35th running of the annual marathon race in New York City, United States, which took place on Sunday, November 7. The men's elite race was won by South Africa's Hendrick Ramaala in a time of 2:09:28 hours while the women's race was won by Great Britain's Paula Radcliffe in 2:23:10.

In the wheelchair races, Mexico's Saúl Mendoza (1:33:16) and Switzerland's Edith Hunkeler (1:53:27) won the men's and women's divisions, respectively. In the handcycle race, Australia's Todd Philpott (1:17:12) and Dutchwoman Angelique Simons (1:50:02) were the winners.

A total of 36,513 runners finished the race, 24,563 men and 11,950 women.

Results

Men

Women

 † Ran in mass race

Wheelchair men

Wheelchair women

Handcycle men

Handcycle women

References

Results
2004 New York Marathon Results. New York Road Runners. Retrieved 2020-05-18.
Men's results. Association of Road Racing Statisticians. Retrieved 2020-05-18.
Women's results. Association of Road Racing Statisticians. Retrieved 2020-05-18.

External links

New York Road Runners website

2004
New York City
Marathon
New York City Marathon